The Class P 4 steam locomotives of the Palatine Railways were express train locomotives with a 2'B1' (Atlantic) axle arrangement and a four-cylinder compound engine. A total of eleven locomotives were built by Maffei, numbers 286–291 in 1905 and 302–305 and 433 in 1906. They replaced the P 3.1 in express train service.

The locomotives were initially fitted with Pielock superheaters, but after a few years they had to be removed again due to corrosion damage. From then on the locomotives operated as wet steam engines.

The P 4 was one of the first locomotives in Germany with bar frames. It was based on the Bavarian class built in 1903, the S 2/5; up to the second coupling axle, both types were almost the same apart from details and minor dimensional deviations. However, the P 4 had - unlike the S 2/5 - a wide firebox which was arranged completely behind the coupling wheels. For this reason, the distance between the coupling axle and the rear carrying axle had to be increased significantly and the carrying axle had to be designed to be radially adjustable. This and also the streamlined cab of the P 4 gave the locomotives a distinct appearance at the rear.

The P 4 was also closely related to other Bavarian locomotive types from Maffei: the engine was adopted almost unchanged for the high-speed locomotive of the S 2/6 built in 1906 - only the cylinder diameters were slightly enlarged - otherwise both locomotives had a lot in common. The family resemblance to the Class S 3/6 built from 1908 onwards is also unmistakable; the latter looks like an enlarged P 4 with a coupling axle added.

In the provisional reclassification plan by the Deutsche Reichsbahn all eleven locomotives were due to be reassigned numbers 14 151 to 14 161, but they were decommissioned before the redesignation.

Literature 
 Wilhelm Reuter: Die Schönsten der Schiene – Die Geschichte der Atlantic. Transpress, Berlin 1993, ISBN 3-613-01512-9

P 4
Railway locomotives introduced in 1905
Maffei locomotives
Standard gauge locomotives of Germany
Passenger locomotives
4-4-2 locomotives